The Monster Energy Cup may refer to
 Monster Energy Cup (Supercross), an annual AMA Supercross Championship event in Las Vegas
 NASCAR Cup Series, also known as the Monster Energy NASCAR Cup Series